Women's artistic gymnastics qualification at the 2018 Summer Youth Olympics was held at the Parque Polideportivo Roca from October 7–10. The results of the qualification determined the qualifiers to the finals: 18 gymnasts in the all-around final, and 8 gymnasts in each of 4 apparatus finals.

Results

All-around 
Qualification for the All-Around Final took place from October 7–10, with one event per day.

Vault 
Qualification for the Vault Final was held on October 8.

Uneven bars 
Qualification for the Uneven Bars Final was held on October 9.

Balance beam 
Qualification for the Balance Beam Final was held on October 10.

Floor exercise 
Qualification for the Floor Exercise Final was held on October 7.

References 

Gymnastics at the 2018 Summer Youth Olympics